The Band AKA were an American male vocal/instrumental group of session musicians based in Los Angeles, California who were active during the 1980s. The membership of The Band AKA was fluid throughout their existence and essentially they were creation of their producer and songwriter Jaeson James Jarrett.

"Grace", a track from their 1981 eponymous debut album entered the UK singles charts on 15 May 1982 after appearing for some weeks on a number of local dance and club charts. It reached a peak of number 41 in a five-week run on the chart. In its 12” single form "Grace" featured a memorable saxophone solo courtesy of Jimmy Carter and the same formula was used to record the follow up “Joy”. This song entered the chart on 5 March 1983, and reached number 24, remaining in the charts for 7 weeks.

The Band AKA released three albums before ceasing their activities in the late 80s.

Discography

Albums
 The Band AKA (PPL Records, 1981) 
 Men of the Music (Epic Records, 1983)
 Master of the Game (Bouvier Records, 1987)
 Ghosts (PPL Records, 2005)

Singles

References

External links
 Discography at Discogs.

American vocal groups
American dance music groups
American soul musical groups
American funk musical groups
American boogie musicians
Musical groups established in 1977
Musical groups from California